Shane Hamman (born June 20, 1972) is an American Olympic weightlifter and powerlifter.

Early years
Shane Hamman was born in Oklahoma City, Oklahoma, and brought up in Mustang, Oklahoma. Hamman began to play soccer at the age of 6 until he was 12 years old. In his freshman year of high school, Hamman began football and was a standout for two years on the freshman and varsity squads. He also wrestled his junior year.

Hamman grew strong lifting large pallets of produce for his father's fruit market. During high school, he had broken several teenage records. He trained as a powerlifter after high school, but after seeing the 1996 Summer Olympics, he decided to switch his career to Olympic-style weightlifting.

Olympic weightlifting/Powerlifting
Shane began his career as a powerlifter, competing for the International Powerlifting Federation. He competed in the IPF World Championships in 1994 & 1995, finished third and second respectively.

His greatest equipped squat was 457.5 kg at the USPF National Championships on March 9, 1996, which stood as the world record until Andrey Konovalov squatted 460 kg on November 4, 2012.

Hamman is sometimes called the strongest man in America. He won all 9 American Senior National Championship that he competed in (1997-2005). He holds every American weightlifting record in his class.

He competed in the 2000 Summer Olympics and finished 10th. In the qualifying for the Olympics, during the 2003 World Championships, on his final lift he single-handedly secured three spots for athletes from the U.S. in the 2004 Summer Olympics. In the Olympics, he finished 7th in his weight category, setting a new American record with his total of 430 kg and his clean and jerk of 237.5 kg.

Aside from his weightlifting prowess, Hamman also plays basketball and golf. Despite his  frame, he can hit a golf ball , do a standing back flip, and leap vertically three feet (0.9 m).

Hamman has retired from Olympic weightlifting, and sometimes appears as an announcer in events like the Olympics in 2008 and 2016 for NBC.

Hamman is now focusing on helping others. He gives speeches at various high schools about his career and what it took to get Olympian status. Hamman also visits high schools to promote "Rachel's Challenge", a program for which he is a spokesperson.

References 

1972 births
Living people
Sportspeople from Oklahoma City
American male weightlifters
Olympic weightlifters of the United States
American powerlifters
Weightlifters at the 2000 Summer Olympics
Weightlifters at the 2004 Summer Olympics
Weightlifters at the 1999 Pan American Games
People from Mustang, Oklahoma
Pan American Games gold medalists for the United States
Pan American Games medalists in weightlifting
Medalists at the 1999 Pan American Games
20th-century American people
21st-century American people